Perth Amboy Technical High School (also known as MCVTS at Perth Amboy, Perth Amboy Tech and Perth Amboy Campus) is a four-year career academy and college preparatory magnet public high school for students in ninth through twelfth grades located in Perth Amboy in Middlesex County, New Jersey, United States, operating as part of the Middlesex County Vocational and Technical Schools. The school serves students from all of Middlesex County.

As of the 2021–22 school year, the school had an enrollment of 274 students and 21.0 classroom teachers (on an FTE basis), for a student–teacher ratio of 13.0:1. There were 118 students (43.1% of enrollment) eligible for free lunch and 41 (15.0% of students) eligible for reduced-cost lunch.

Awards and recognition
The school was recognized by the National Blue Ribbon Schools Program in 2012, one of 17 schools in New Jersey to be honored that year.

Demographics and statistics
The enrollment of PAVTS consists of 58% male and 42% female students. Of those enrolled 27.1% are 9th graders, 25.8% are 10th graders, 24.4% are 11th graders, and 22.7% are 12th graders. PAVTS is a very diverse school having 52.2% Hispanics, 36.4% Caucasian/White, 10% African American, and 1.3% Asian. The schools proficiency levels of math is 57% and English is at a high of 92%.
  
According to past yearbooks, girls started attending the old Perth Amboy campus around the years 1974-1975. According to Principal Robert Fuller, over the past 11 years the dropout rate for the new Perth Amboy campus was a steady 0% due to the fact that students who left this campus returned to their district school and graduated. Over the past 7 years of this campus, the graduation rate was at 100% but over the years it slowly went down to 95-98% because many students went to their district but never reported with their state ID.

History
The Perth Amboy Vocational Technical School was built in 1915-1916 on Bettrand Avenue in Perth Amboy by the name of "Middlesex County Vocational School No.2." It was one of the first schools in the district which was founded in 1914; it had opened on October 1, 1916 with 45 students.  Subjects that were studied were machine shops practice, mechanical drawing, mathematics, science, English and civics.
In 1927 staff and students were relocated to a building in New Brunswick Avenue in Perth Amboy, It was a 3-story building with six shops; it had a small gym and a parking lot that could only accommodate staff. Shops were intended to help students get jobs and enter the workforce after graduation. 
In the earlier years most classes were segregated and were gender specific. Eventually shops became integrated. In the last year of the second building the shops were Machine Technology, Auto Mechanics, Computer Assisted Business, Computer Assisted Drafting and Design, HVAC, Carpentry, Electrical Trade and a day would have 8 periods. The sports involved Soccer, Basketball and Softball, respectively each had Varsity and Junior Varsity and girls didn't participate in sports. The school at one point held over 400 students and eventually needed to be expanded in order to accommodate more.

In Summer/Fall 2002 construction of the new building started and it opened in spring of 2004. The new school allowed girls' programs for basketball, softball and co-ed soccer. The new building allowed expanded programs in the school and Middlesex County College is also located in the facility.

New campus
The new Middlesex County Vocational and Technical High School, on High Street, Perth Amboy, is a  building. Its cost was about $28 million and replaced the 76-year-old building on New Brunswick Avenue. It was decided that the school should stay located there. As projected, the school houses up to 250 high school students. In the evenings there's an average of about 100 adults students and 250 part-time college students in the building.

The school offers special classes or 'shops' to students with an interest in learning a new skill. Some of the shops consist of carpentry, electrical trades, and heating, ventilation and air conditioning (HVAC). This area is considered the School of Construction and Technology. Each area is like a major at a college.

The second area is the School of Computer and Business technology. This area of study in the school includes computer applications, computer assisted drafting and computer systems technology. Students obtain the benefit to learn how to work in a busy office environment in preparation to obtain their certification in their respected field.

The last area is the School of Professional Services. The two remaining shops to conclude this series are auto mechanics technology and culinary arts. Here the students will learn the maintenance and basic repair of vehicles and grow accustomed to the work space of a busy restaurant environment.

To expand on the uses of the building aside from providing shops, there is the inclusion of a wellness center, media center, athletic fields, and a gymnasium. The building also includes computer rooms in between classrooms to provide students with easy access to the internet in case of class activities or research. The remaining 112,000 square feet of the building, will be utilized for the Middlesex County College.

Having both the high school and college share the same building enables students to see life after graduation. It allows easy access to the college and gives them a firsthand experience as to how they should go about as to managing their college necessities.

Shops
Perth Amboy Tech offers courses in the following industrial arts:
 Auto Mechanics
 Carpentry
 Graphic Design
 Culinary Arts
 Computer Systems Technology (CST)
 Electrical Engineering Technology
 Heating Ventilating and Air Conditioning (HVAC)

Athletics
The Perth Amboy Tech Patriots compete in the Greater Middlesex Conference, which operates under the supervision of the New Jersey State Interscholastic Athletic Association (NJSIAA). With 212 students in grades 10-12, the school was classified by the NJSIAA for the 2019–20 school year as Group I for most athletic competition purposes, which included schools with an enrollment of 75 to 476 students in that grade range.

School colors are blue and white. Interscholastic sports offered by the school are baseball (men), basketball (men and women), soccer (men) and softball (women).

1992 boys' basketball GMC/NJTAC state champions
1992 boys' basketball GMC champions
1993 boys' basketball GMC/NJSIAA Central Jersey Group I state champions
1993 boys' basketball NJSIAA Group I state champions (with a 42-33 win vs. Cresskill High School)
1993 boys' basketball NJTAC champions
1996 boys' baseball NJTAC champions
1996 boys' basketball GMC champions
2005 boys' basketball GMC champions
2006 soccer GMC champions
2015 boys' basketball GMC Gold Division champions

Administration
The school's principal is Brian Bilal. His administration team includes the assistant principal.

References

External links
School website
Middlesex County Vocational and Technical Schools

National Center for Educational Statistics data for the Middlesex County Vocational and Technical Schools

1916 establishments in New Jersey
Educational institutions established in 1916
Magnet schools in New Jersey
Perth Amboy, New Jersey
Public high schools in Middlesex County, New Jersey